The Chortle Awards were set up in 2002 by the comedy website Chortle to honour the best of established stand-up comics currently working in the UK. A panel of reviewers draw up a shortlist, which is presented for public vote at the Chortle website.

2002

2003

2004

2005

2006

2007

2008

2009

2010

2011

2012
In 2012, Charlie Brooker won the TV award for Black Mirror and his work on 10 O'Clock Live, while Stewart Lee was awarded "best standup DVD" for the second series of Stewart Lee's Comedy Vehicle. Lee's former comic partner Richard Herring won the internet award. Dylan Moran won "best tour", Tim Key was awarded "best show", and Simon Munnery received the award for innovation. Prior to the awards, Chortle responded to accusations of sexism (of 54 nominees, only two were women). Editor Steve Bennett described the controversy as "a storm we never saw coming."

2013

2014

2015

2016

2017

2018
The winners were announced in March 2018, and marked the first time that women had won more than half of the award in the live comedy category.

2019
The winners were announced in March 2019.

2020
The winners were announced in March 2020.

2021
Awards were made despite the COVID-19 lockdown recognising comedians who triumphed despite the problems.

Alex Horne, Alistair Green, Archie Henderson, aka Jazz Emu, Catherine Bohart for Gigless, The Covid Arms, Fergus Craig, The Isolation Song Contest, Janey Godley, John Robertson, Marcus Brigstocke and Rachel Parris, Mark Olver, Mark Watson, Munya Chawawa, Petrichor, Richard Herring, Rob Sedgebeer, Robin Ince and Cosmic Shambles Network, Stevie Martin, Tim Key, Toussaint Douglass, The Warren, Brighton were all recognised as "legends of lockdown" with awards made by video.

2022
The winners were announced in March 2022.

External links

References

British comedy and humour awards
English awards
2002 establishments in the United Kingdom
Awards established in 2002